The 2003 Angola Basketball Super Cup (10th edition) was contested by Primeiro de Agosto, as the 2002 league champion and Petro Atlético, the 2002 cup runner-up. Primeiro de Agosto was the winner, making its 3rd title.

The 2003 Women's Basketball Super Cup was contested by Primeiro de Agosto, as the 2002 Angolan women's league winner and Desportivo do Maculusso, the 2002 cup runner-up.

2003 Men's Super Cup

2003 Women's Super Cup

See also
 2003 Angola Basketball Cup
 2002 BAI Basket

References

Angola Basketball Super Cup seasons
Super Cup